2018 is the second year in the history of Legacy Fighting Alliance, a mixed martial arts promotion based in the United States.

Event list

Legacy Fighting Alliance 30: Millender vs. Barnes

Legacy Fighting Alliance 30: Millender vs. Barnes was the thirty-first event of Legacy Fighting Alliance and took place on January 12, 2018. It aired on AXS TV.
 
Results

Legacy Fighting Alliance 31: Moffett vs. Le

Legacy Fighting Alliance 31: Moffett vs. Le was the thirty-second event of Legacy Fighting Alliance and took place on January 19, 2018. It aired on AXS TV.
 
Results

Legacy Fighting Alliance 32: Allen vs. Hernandez

Legacy Fighting Alliance 32: Allen vs. Hernandez was the thirty-third event of Legacy Fighting Alliance and took place on January 26, 2018. It aired on AXS TV.
 
Results

Legacy Fighting Alliance 33: Willis vs. Stewart

Legacy Fighting Alliance 33: Willis vs. Stewart was the thirty-fourth event of Legacy Fighting Alliance and took place on February 16, 2018. It aired on AXS TV.
 
Results

Legacy Fighting Alliance 34: Watley vs. Jenkins

Legacy Fighting Alliance 34: Watley vs. Jenkins was the thirty-fifth event of Legacy Fighting Alliance and took place on March 2, 2018. It aired on AXS TV.
 
Results

Legacy Fighting Alliance 35: Newell vs. Luque

Legacy Fighting Alliance 35: Newell vs. Luque was the thirty-sixth event of Legacy Fighting Alliance and took place on March 9, 2018. It aired on AXS TV.
 
Results

Legacy Fighting Alliance 36: Simón vs. Zani

Legacy Fighting Alliance 36: Simón vs. Zani was the thirty-seventh event of Legacy Fighting Alliance and took place on March 23, 2018. It aired on AXS TV.
 
Results

Legacy Fighting Alliance 37: Bice vs. Perez

Legacy Fighting Alliance 37: Bice vs. Perez was the thirty-eighth event of Legacy Fighting Alliance and took place on April 20, 2018. It aired on AXS TV.
 
Results

Legacy Fighting Alliance 38: Hughes vs. Greene

Legacy Fighting Alliance 38: Hughes vs. Greene was the thirty-ninth event of Legacy Fighting Alliance and took place on April 27, 2018. It aired on AXS TV.
 
Results

Legacy Fighting Alliance 39: Heinisch vs. Checco

Legacy Fighting Alliance 39: Heinisch vs. Checco was the fortieth event of Legacy Fighting Alliance and took place on May 4, 2018. It aired on AXS TV.
 
Results

Legacy Fighting Alliance 40: Aguilar vs. Le

Legacy Fighting Alliance 40: Aguilar vs. Le was the forty-first event of Legacy Fighting Alliance and took place on May 25, 2018. It aired on AXS TV.
 
Results

Legacy Fighting Alliance 41: Moisés vs. Peterson

Legacy Fighting Alliance 41: Moisés vs. Peterson was the forty-second event of Legacy Fighting Alliance and took place on June 1, 2018. It aired on AXS TV.
 
Results

Legacy Fighting Alliance 42: Krantz vs. Kayne

Legacy Fighting Alliance 42: Krantz vs. Kayne was the forty-third event of Legacy Fighting Alliance and took place on June 8, 2018. It aired on AXS TV.
 
Results

Legacy Fighting Alliance 43: Allen vs. Crowe

Legacy Fighting Alliance 43: Allen vs. Crowe was the forty-fourth event of Legacy Fighting Alliance and took place on June 22, 2018. It aired on AXS TV.
 
Results

Legacy Fighting Alliance 44: Frincu vs. Aguilera

Legacy Fighting Alliance 44: Frincu vs. Aguilera was the forty-fifth event of Legacy Fighting Alliance and took place on June 29, 2018. It aired on AXS TV.
 
Results

Legacy Fighting Alliance 45: Silva vs. Barnes

Legacy Fighting Alliance 45: Silva vs. Barnes was the forty-sixth event of Legacy Fighting Alliance and took place on July 20, 2018. It aired on AXS TV.
 
Results

Legacy Fighting Alliance 46: Nakashima vs. Stewart

Legacy Fighting Alliance 46: Nakashima vs. Stewart was the forty-seventh event of Legacy Fighting Alliance and took place on July 27, 2018. It aired on AXS TV.
 
Results

Legacy Fighting Alliance 47: Jackson vs. Jennerman

Legacy Fighting Alliance 47: Jackson vs. Jennerman was the forty-eighth event of Legacy Fighting Alliance and took place on August 10, 2018. It aired on AXS TV.
 
Results

Legacy Fighting Alliance 48: Stots vs. Lilley

Legacy Fighting Alliance 48: Stots vs. Lilley was the forty-ninth event of Legacy Fighting Alliance and took place on September 7, 2018. It aired on AXS TV.
 
Results

Legacy Fighting Alliance 49: Brady vs. Urbina

Legacy Fighting Alliance 49: Brady vs. Urbina was the fiftieth event of Legacy Fighting Alliance and took place on September 14, 2018. It aired on AXS TV.
 
Results

Legacy Fighting Alliance 50: Allen vs. Hiley

Legacy Fighting Alliance 50: Allen vs. Hiley was the fifty-first event of Legacy Fighting Alliance and took place on September 21, 2018. It aired on AXS TV.
 
Results

Legacy Fighting Alliance 51: Gibson vs. Erak

Legacy Fighting Alliance 51: Gibson vs. Erak was the fifty-second event of Legacy Fighting Alliance and took place on September 28, 2018. It aired on AXS TV.
 
Results

Legacy Fighting Alliance 52: Rodriguez vs. Gutierrez

Legacy Fighting Alliance 52: Rodriguez vs. Gutierrez was the fifty-third event of Legacy Fighting Alliance and took place on October 19, 2018. It aired on AXS TV.
 
Results

Legacy Fighting Alliance 53: Royval vs. Kenney

Legacy Fighting Alliance 53: Royval vs. Kenney was the fifty-fourth event of Legacy Fighting Alliance and took place on November 9, 2018. It aired on AXS TV.
 
Results

Legacy Fighting Alliance 54: Mazo vs. Yariwaki

Legacy Fighting Alliance 54: Mazo vs. Yariwaki was the fifty-fifth event of Legacy Fighting Alliance and took place on November 16, 2018. It aired on AXS TV.
 
Results

Legacy Fighting Alliance 55: Johns vs. Yanez

Legacy Fighting Alliance 55: Johns vs. Yanez was the fifty-sixth event of Legacy Fighting Alliance and took place on November 30, 2018. It aired on AXS TV.
 
Results

Legacy Fighting Alliance 56: Hubbard vs. Mota

Legacy Fighting Alliance 56: Hubbard vs. Mota was the fifty-seventh event of Legacy Fighting Alliance and took place on December 7, 2018. It aired on AXS TV.
 
Results

References

External links
http://www.lfafighting.com

Legacy Fighting Alliance
2018 in mixed martial arts